"Sim ou Não" is a song by Brazilian singer Anitta featuring Colombian singer Maluma, released on July 28, 2016 by Warner Music. It was composed by Anitta, Umberto Tavares and Jefferson Junior, with additional lyrics in Spanish written by Maluma. A Spanish version of the song, entitled "Sí o No" ("Yes or No"), was also recorded by the singer.

"Sim ou Não" is a pop song, with lyrics that talks about the desire between two people in different environments. The music video for the song was recorded on July 4, 2016, in Mexico City, and was directed by Jessy Terrero.

Music videos
The music video of the song was recorded on July 4, 2016 in a nightclub in Mexico City, and was directed by the Dominican director Jessy Terrero, who has worked with other Latin artists such as Enrique Iglesias, Anahí, Ricky Martin and Jennifer Lopez.

Anitta recorded the music video for the Spanish version in Los Angeles, California, in November 2016. She had extensions to her hair as she had shoulder-length hair at the time of the shooting. It premiered on December 9, 2016, on her YouTube account.

Live performances
Anitta first performed the song on Rede Globo's TV show Caldeirão do Huck, on August 6, 2016. On August 17, 2016, she performed the song on Rede Globo's Encontro com Fátima Bernardes TV show. She later performed it on August 23, on her own TV show, Música Boa Ao Vivo, on Multishow, and later performed the song on Rede Record's TV shows Programa da Sabrina, on August 27, and on Hora do Faro, the following day. On November 9, she performed the song on the stage of X Factor Brasil. All performances did not feature Maluma.

Reception

Commercial performance
The song peaked at number 15 on the (Billboard Brasil Hot 100 Airplay).

Track listings

CD single
 "Sim Ou Não" (ft. Maluma) – 3:26

Digital download
 "Sim Ou Não" (ft. Maluma) – 3:26
 "Sí O No" (ft. Maluma) – 3:27

Charts

Certifications

References

2016 songs
2016 singles
Anitta (singer) songs
Maluma songs
Songs written by Anitta (singer)
Portuguese-language songs
Spanish-language songs
Portuñol songs
Macaronic songs
Songs written by Maluma (singer)
Music videos directed by Jessy Terrero